is a former Japanese football player who last played for Blaublitz Akita.

Career statistics
Updated to 23 February 2019.

References

External links

Profile at Kawasaki Frontale
Profile at Consadole Sapporo
Profile at Roasso Kumamoto

1989 births
Living people
Association football people from Shizuoka Prefecture
Japanese footballers
J1 League players
J2 League players
J3 League players
Kawasaki Frontale players
FC Machida Zelvia players
Hokkaido Consadole Sapporo players
Roasso Kumamoto players
Fujieda MYFC players
Blaublitz Akita players
Asian Games medalists in football
Footballers at the 2010 Asian Games
Medalists at the 2010 Asian Games
Asian Games gold medalists for Japan
Association football defenders